Dharmo Rakshati Rakshitah (IAST: dharmo rakṣati rakṣitaḥ) is a popular Sanskrit phrase mentioned in Mahabharata and Manusmriti verse 8.15. It can be loosely translated as "The Dharma protects those who protect it." The closest synonyms for Dharma in English are righteousness and ethics. 

The phrase is a part of a full Manusmriti verse that says:

Manusmriti first translated by Sir William Jones in 1776 for making legal provisions for Hindu in the British India including other Sanskrit religious books.

It is the motto of the Research and Analysis Wing, the Supreme Court of India, and National Law School of India University.

See also
 No justice, no peace, another slogan focused on the benefits of justice.

References

Sanskrit mottos
Mahabharata

Justice